Lonnie Gene Kluttz (September 17, 1945 – February 16, 2019) was an American professional basketball player. He played in three games for the American Basketball Association's Carolina Cougars during the 1970–71 season.

References

1945 births
2019 deaths
American men's basketball players
Basketball players from North Carolina
Carolina Cougars players
Chicago Bulls draft picks
Forwards (basketball)
North Carolina A&T Aggies men's basketball players
People from Rowan County, North Carolina